Anambah is a locality in the City of Maitland region of New South Wales.

It is scheduled for suburban development in future as a continuation of the Maitland growth corridor.

Notable People 

 Henry Luke White born there in 1860.

Heritage listings
Anambah has a number of heritage-listed sites, including:
 Anambah Road: Anambah House

References

Localities in New South Wales
City of Maitland